Enzo Agustín Ybañez (born 29 August 1998) is an Argentine professional footballer who plays as a left-back for Club Comunicaciones, on loan from Argentinos Juniors.

Career
Ybañez spent time in the River Plate youth system prior to joining the ranks of Argentinos Juniors. He made his professional debut in the final match of Argentinos' Primera B Nacional title-winning campaign of 2016–17, versus Chacarita Juniors on 30 July 2017. On 26 December 2019, it was confirmed that Ybañez and his teammate, Gabriel Carrasco, had joined Primera División side Godoy Cruz on loan for the rest of the season. He made just two appearances, in January versus River Plate and in March versus Vélez Sarsfield, before returning to his parent club. 

On 31 July 2020, he was then loaned out to Barracas Central for the 2020–21 season. He never played an official match for the club, before returning to Argentinos in May 2022. In June 2022, he joined Club Comunicaciones on loan.

Career statistics
.

Honours
Argentinos Juniors
Primera B Nacional: 2016–17

References

External links

1998 births
Living people
People from Tigre, Buenos Aires
Argentine footballers
Association football defenders
Primera Nacional players
Argentine Primera División players
Argentinos Juniors footballers
Godoy Cruz Antonio Tomba footballers
Barracas Central players
Club Almirante Brown footballers
Club Comunicaciones footballers
Sportspeople from Buenos Aires Province